Deeper may refer to:

Music

Albums
Deeper (Delirious? album) or the title song (see below), 2001
Deeper (Lisa Stansfield album) or the title song, 2018
Deeper (Meredith Andrews album) or the title song, 2016
Deeper (The Soft Moon album) or the title song, 2015
Deeper, by Julie Anne San Jose, 2014
Deeper, by Planetshakers, 2009
Deeper (EP), by MadGibbs, or the title song, 2013
Deeper, an EP by Ella Eyre, or the title song, 2013

Songs
"Deeper" (Boss song), 1993
"Deeper" (Delirious? song), 1997
"Deeper" (Serious Danger song), 1997
"Deeper", by MNEK and Riton, 2017
"Deeper", by Olly Murs from 24 Hrs, 2016
"Deeper", by Plan B from Heaven Before All Hell Breaks Loose, 2018
"Deeper", by Summer Walker, 2020

Other uses
Deeper (Gordon and Williams novel), a 2008 Tunnels novel by Roderick Gordon and Brian Williams
Deeper (Long novel), a 2007 novel by Jeff Long
Deeper, a 2010 extreme alpine sports film by Teton Gravity Research

See also
Deep (disambiguation)
Deeper and Deeper (disambiguation)